Richard Gault Leslie Paige (May 31, 1846 – September 21, 1904) was a machinist and politician who served as a member of the Virginia House of Delegates, representing Norfolk County, from 1871 to 1875 during the Reconstruction era, and again from 1879 to 1883. A Republican, he was one of the first African Americans to serve in Virginia's government. He was successful in business.

See also
 African-American officeholders during and following the Reconstruction era

References

External links

1846 births
1904 deaths
African-American politicians during the Reconstruction Era
African-American state legislators in Virginia
Republican Party members of the Virginia House of Delegates
20th-century African-American people